Eosipterus is an extinct genus of ctenochasmatid pterosaur from the Early Cretaceous period of Liaoning, China. Fossil remains of Eosipterus dated back to the Aptian stage of the Early Cretaceous, 124.6 million years ago.

History and etymology
The genus was named in 1997 by Ji Shu'an and Ji Qiang. The type species is Eosipterus yangi. The genus name is derived from Greek eos, "dawn" and Greek pteron, "wing" with a Latin ending; and a grammar error: normally the combination would have resulted in "eopterus". The "dawn" element refers to its age but also to China being "in the east". The specific name honours paleontologist Yang Daihuan.

The genus is based on the holotype specimen, GMV2117, found near Jinggangshan in western Liaoning Province, in the Yixian Formation. It was the first pterosaur discovered in that region. It consists of a partial crushed skeleton of a subadult individual on a slab, lacking skull and neck. Most vertebrae have been severely damaged and even their number cannot be determined. The authors state that eighteen detached belly ribs are present in the matrix.

Description

Postcranial skeleton
The wings are robust and elongated. The wing finger has the standard four phalanges, a difference from the possibly related Beipiaopterus which has lost the fourth phalanx.

The pelvis is not well preserved. The fibula is strongly reduced. The foot claws are slightly curved; the fifth toe has been reduced to a single claw.

Classification
The authors placed Eosipterus in a general Pterodactyloidea incertae sedis; in 1999 a placement within Pterodactylidae was suggested, and even a synonymy with Pterodactylus was proposed within a hypothesis that the lower Yixian Formation dated from the Late Jurassic. A cladistic study in 2006 found that it was a member of the Ctenochasmatidae — David Unwin more precisely assigned it to the Ctenochasmatinae.

Below is cladogram following a topology by Andres, Clark and Xu (2014). In the analysis, they recovered Eosipterus within the family Ctenochasmatidae, more precisely within the tribe Pterodaustrini, placed in a more derived position than Pterodaustro.

See also
 List of pterosaur genera
 Timeline of pterosaur research

References
Ji, S. & Ji Q., 1997, "Discovery of a new pterosaur in western Liaoning, China", Acta Geologica Sinica, 71(2) pp. 115–121
Ji, S. A., Ji, Q., and Padian, K., 1999, "Biostratigraphy of new pterosaurs from China", Nature, 398: 573
Lü Junchang, Gao Chunling, Meng Qingjin, Liu Jinyuan, Ji Qiang, 2006, "On the Systematic Position of Eosipterus yangi Ji et Ji, 1997 among Pterodactyloids", Acta Geologica Sinica 80(5)
Wang Xiaolin, Kellner, A. W. A., Zhou Zhonghe, and Campos, D. A., 2007, "A new pterosaur (Ctenochasmatidae, Archaeopterodactyloidea) from the Lower Cretaceous Yixian Formation of China", Cretaceous Research, 28: 245–260

External links
Eosipterus in The Pterosauria

Ctenochasmatoids
Early Cretaceous pterosaurs of Asia
Fossil taxa described in 1997
Yixian fauna